Eliakim Hastings Moore (January 26, 1862 – December 30, 1932), usually cited as E. H. Moore or E. Hastings Moore, was an American mathematician.

Life
Moore, the son of a Methodist minister and grandson of US Congressman Eliakim H. Moore, discovered mathematics through a summer job at the Cincinnati Observatory while in high school. He subsequently studied mathematics at Yale University, where he was a member of Skull and Bones and obtained a BA in 1883 and the PhD in 1885 with a thesis supervised by Hubert Anson Newton, on some work of William Kingdon Clifford and Arthur Cayley. Newton encouraged Moore to study in Germany, and thus he spent an academic year at the University of Berlin, attending lectures by Leopold Kronecker and Karl Weierstrass.

On his return to the United States, Moore taught at Yale and at Northwestern University. When the University of Chicago opened its doors in 1892, Moore was the first head of its mathematics department, a position he retained until his death in 1932. His first two colleagues were Oskar Bolza and Heinrich Maschke. The resulting department was the second research-oriented mathematics department in American history, after Johns Hopkins University.

Accomplishments
Moore first worked in abstract algebra, proving in 1893 the classification of the structure of finite fields (also called Galois fields). Around 1900, he began working on the foundations of geometry. He reformulated Hilbert's axioms for geometry so that points were the only primitive notion, thus turning David Hilbert's primitive lines and planes into defined notions. In 1902, he further showed that one of Hilbert's axioms for geometry was redundant. His work on axiom systems is considered one of the starting points for metamathematics and model theory. After 1906, he turned to the foundations of analysis. The concept of a closure operator first appeared in his 1910 Introduction to a form of general analysis. He also wrote on algebraic geometry, number theory, and integral equations.

At Chicago, Moore supervised 31 doctoral dissertations, including those of George Birkhoff, Leonard Dickson, Robert Lee Moore (no relation), and Oswald Veblen. Birkhoff and Veblen went on to lead departments at Harvard and Princeton, respectively. Dickson became the first great American algebraist and number theorist. Robert Moore founded American topology. According to the Mathematics Genealogy Project, as of December 2012, E. H. Moore had  over 18,900 known "descendants."

Moore convinced the New York Mathematical Society to change its name to the American Mathematical Society, whose Chicago branch he led. He presided over the AMS, 1901–02, and edited the Transactions of the American Mathematical Society, 1899–1907. He was elected to the National Academy of Sciences, the American Academy of Arts and Sciences, and the American Philosophical Society. He was an Invited Speaker at the International Congress of Mathematicians in 1908 in Rome and in 1912 in Cambridge, England.

The American Mathematical Society established a prize in his honor in 2002.

See also
 Moore–Penrose inverse
 Moore–Smith sequence
 Moore matrix over a finite field
 Moore determinant of a Hermitian matrix over a quaternion algebra

Notes

References
Ivor Grattan-Guinness (2000) The Search for Mathematical Roots 1870–1940. Princeton University Press.
 Karen Parshall and David E. Rowe (1994) The emergence of the American mathematical research community, 1876–1900 : J. J. Sylvester, Felix Klein, and E. H. Moore,  American Mathematical Society.

External links
 
 
 
 David Lindsay Roberts, Moore´s early twentieth century program for reform in mathematics education, American Mathematical Monthly, vol. 108, 2001, pp. 689–696
Guide to the Eliakim Hastings Moore Papers 1899-1931 at the University of Chicago Special Collections Research Center

1862 births
1932 deaths
19th-century American mathematicians
20th-century American mathematicians
Algebraic geometers
Algebraists
Geometers
Mathematical analysts
Members of the United States National Academy of Sciences
Northwestern University faculty
Number theorists
People from Marietta, Ohio
Presidents of the American Mathematical Society
University of Chicago faculty
Yale University alumni
Yale University faculty